Capilano was a steamship built in 1920 in British Columbia, which served until 1949.

Design and construction
Capilano was built in 1920 at the BC Marine Ways for the Union Steamship Company. Union Steamship had acquired the assets of the All Day Line, which included a steamboat route from Vancouver to Selma Park, British Columbia. (Selma Park is now a neighborhood of Sechelt, BC.) Capilano was built for this route.

Operations
Capilano operated on a route running along the Sunshine Coast of mainland British Columbia.

Disposition
Capilano was withdrawn from service in 1949.

Notes

References

Further reading

1920 ships
Steamboats of British Columbia
Union Steamship Company of British Columbia